Neptuneopsis gilchristi, common name the Gilchrist's volute, is a species of sea snail, a marine gastropod mollusk in the family Volutidae, the volutes.

Description

Distribution

References

Volutidae
Gastropods described in 1898